T. R. Pugh Memorial Park (or The Old Mill) is a re-creation of an 1880s era water-powered grist mill located in North Little Rock, Arkansas. It was used in the opening scenes of the movie classic Gone With The Wind. In 2010, the site was listed on the National Register of Historic Places.

The park was built in 1933 by Justin Matthews and named in honor of Thomas R. Pugh, of Portland, Arkansas, who was a close friend and benefactor of Matthews. The architect for the park and the mill was Frank Carmean with artist Dionicio Rodriguez serving as sculptor of the concrete work to simulate wooden, iron, and steel structures.

In the present day, the Old Mill serves as the backdrop for weddings and portrait photography.

In 2008, the roof was set on fire, but no permanent damage resulted.

See also 
 National Register of Historic Places listings in Pulaski County, Arkansas

References

External links 

 North Little Rock, Old Mill (The)
 Friends of the Old Mill

1933 establishments in Arkansas
Buildings and structures in North Little Rock, Arkansas
Buildings and structures completed in 1933
Tourist attractions in North Little Rock, Arkansas
Parks on the National Register of Historic Places in Arkansas
National Register of Historic Places in Pulaski County, Arkansas
Protected areas of Pulaski County, Arkansas
Agricultural buildings and structures on the National Register of Historic Places in Arkansas
Grinding mills on the National Register of Historic Places in Arkansas
Rebuilt buildings and structures in the United States